Tea Tooala Peato (born ~1940) is a Samoan politician.

Peato is from Sa'asa'ai in the district of Faʻasaleleaga and has worked as a businessman. He was first elected to the Legislative Assembly of Samoa at the 1982 election. He was re-elected at the 1985 election but lost his seat in 1988. After taking a break from politics he ran again at the 1996 election and was elected for another term as a member of the Samoan National Development Party. He lost his seat again at the 2001 election, and subsequently spent several years working in a hardware store. He ran unsuccessfully at the 2016 election.

Peato contested the April 2021 election as a candidate for the Fa'atuatua i le Atua Samoa ua Tasi and was again elected to parliament according to preliminary results. On 28 July 2021 he was appointed Associate Minister of Health.

References

Living people
Members of the Legislative Assembly of Samoa
Faʻatuatua i le Atua Samoa ua Tasi politicians
Samoan National Development Party politicians
People from Fa'asaleleaga
Year of birth missing (living people)